The First is the first Japanese studio album by South Korean boy group Shinee. The album was scheduled for release on November 23, 2011, however it was delayed to December 7, 2011 in Japan under EMI Music Japan. The album features three previously released singles, "Replay", "Juliette" and "Lucifer", all of which ranked within the top three on the Oricon charts.

Release
Three of the songs from the album have been released as A-side singles: "Replay", "Juliette" and "Lucifer".  On January 13, 2012, The First was certified Gold by RIAJ for selling over 100,000 copies.

The album was released in three versions, a limited edition special box containing a DVD, an 88-page photo book, a can badge type MP3 player including all the album tracks, and an original 2012 calendar. The DVD includes digest of "Japan Debut Premium Reception Tour" and jacket photo shooting. The limited edition contains a DVD, a 68-page photo book, and a desktop calendar for 2012. The DVD includes digest of "Japan Debut Premium Reception Tour in Japan" and digest of "Japan Debut Premium Reception Tour in London" and the regular edition contains a bonus song "Stranger", the main theme of the TV drama series Strangers 6. It also comes with a 44-page photo book.

Singles

"Replay (Kimi wa Boku no Everything)"
Shinee's debut Japanese single was released on June 22, 2011. It is a remake of their debut Korean single "Replay", included on their Korean debut mini-album of the same name. The B-side is the Japanese version of their Korean single "Hello", part of their second repackage album. The single was released in two CD+DVD versions. The limited version was packed in a digipack includes two bonus tracks, a 68 page photobook and a random (1 of 6) trading card. The regular version contains with a different 44 pages photobook and a postcard (for first press only).

In the first week of sales, the single sold 91,419 copies and reached number two on the Oricon Weekly Chart. It was the highest sales a Korean idol group had recorded for their debut single in the first week. It was certified gold by RIAJ for having 100,000 physical copies shipped in June 2011, a first for a debut single by a Korean male group. It also won the #1 Single of the Year at the 2011 K-Pop Lovers! Awards, hosted by Tower Records Online.

"Juliette"
"Juliette" was released on August 29, 2011, as Shinee's second Japanese single, with an original Japanese song, "Kiss Kiss Kiss", as the B-side.

"Lucifer"
On October 12, 2011, a Japanese version of "Lucifer" was released as Shinee's third Japanese single. The B-side is the Japanese version of their Korean single "Love Like Oxygen", from their first album, The Shinee World. It was released in three versions: a limited edition type A, which included a can badge-type MP3 player including the song "Lucifer", a bonus DVD, a 68-page photo book, a trading card, and digipak; a limited edition type B with the same contents as type A but minus the MP3 player; and a regular edition including a bonus DVD and a 44-page photo book. It was Shinee's third single to rank inside the top three of the Oricon charts, following their debut "Replay" and "Juliette," setting a new record for a foreign artist in the country.

Promotion
Shinee held a concert to celebrate the successful release of their first Japan album on December 24 at the Tokyo International Forum Hall A. The concert took place three times in order to accommodate the 15,000 fans that won the lottery to attend. Onew opened the concert by shouting out, "Let’s have some fun with Shinee today!". They performed a total of six songs, including their debut single, "Replay -Kimi wa Boku no Everything-" and "Lucifer", as well as a new song from their album called "To Your Heart".

The First Japan Arena Tour

Shinee held a 20 performance tour hitting seven locations around Japan. The tour attracted 200,000 concert-goers, setting a new attendance record for the first Japan tour of a Korean artist.

Track listing

Charts

Release history

References

External links 
  
  
 

Shinee albums
EMI Records albums
2011 albums
Dance music albums by South Korean artists
Albums produced by Lee Soo-man
Japanese-language albums
Virgin Records albums